Forrest Lake Townhomes is a 243-house community in Northwest Houston, Texas (USA), located within the boundaries of the Greater Inwood Area near Oak Forest.

Forrest Lake is more like a neighborhood than a typical townhome community in that homes are spaced out and have streets in front of many of the units.

History

Forrest Lake was so named because it had previously been a small dairy farm owned or operated by a Mr Forrest.  The lake may have started off as a farm tank but the developer (Irby Simkins) may have enlarged it and certainly landscaped it well.  In those early days after the developer had departed, Forrest Lake had problems with water ingress from the lake.

Education

Primary and secondary education

Public schools
Forrest Lake's public schools are operated by Aldine Independent School District.

References 

City of Houston Website City of Houston Registered Civic Groups
Forrest Lake Houston Chronicle News Article
The Near Northwest Banner News Website Forrest Lake Near Northwest Banner News Article
The Greater Inwood Partnership Neighborhoods
Inwood Pride

Neighborhoods in Houston